Arctia kolpakofskii is a moth of the family Erebidae. It was described by Sergei Alphéraky in 1882. It is found in eastern Tien Shan in Xinjiang, China.

This species was formerly a member of the genus Acerbia, but was moved to Arctia along with the other species of the genera Acerbia, Pararctia, Parasemia, Platarctia, and Platyprepia.

External links

Moths described in 1882
Arctiina
Moths of Asia